The First Ys cabinet was the 22nd cabinet of the Netherlands Antilles.

Composition
The cabinet was composed as follows:

|Minister of General Affairs and Foreign Affairs
|Etienne Ys
|PAR
|3 June 2002
|-
|Minister of the Interior, Labor and Social Affairs
|Russell Voges
|DP
|3 June 2002
|-
|Minister of Justice
|Norberto Ribeiro
|PAR
|3 June 2002
|-
|Minister for the National Recovery Plan and Economic Affairs
|Erroll Cova
|PLKP
|3 June 2002
|-
|Minister of Education, Youth, Culture, and Sports
|Emily de Jongh-Elhage
|PAR
|3 June 2002
|-
|Minister of Traffic and Communications
|Herbert Domacasse
||UPB
|3 June 2002
|-
|Minister of Finance
|Ersilia de Lannooy
|PNP
|3 June 2002
|-
|Minister of Public Health and Hygiene
|Islelly Pikerie
|PNP
||3 June 2002
|}

References

Cabinets of the Netherlands Antilles
2002 establishments in the Netherlands Antilles
Cabinets established in 2002
Cabinets disestablished in 2003
2003 disestablishments in the Netherlands Antilles